Emmanuil Noevich Yevzerikhin (Russian: Эммануил Ноевич Евзерихин; , Rostov-on-Don  28 March 1984, Moscow) was a Soviet photographer.

Biography
He was born in 1911 to a Jewish family in Rostov-on-Don. In 1934 he moved to Moscow where he was able to photograph many important people and events of the era for TASS - the congress of the Comintern and the congress of Soviets where the constitution was adopted, constructions, parades, and Arctic expeditions. He photographed Maxim Gorky and Mikhail Kalinin and famous pilots Valery Chkalov and Mikhail Gromov. During World War II he was on a number on fronts but his most famous photographs were taken in Stalingrad. He participated in the liberation of Minsk, Warsaw and Konigsberg. After the war he taught photography and lectured around the country. He died in 1984.

References 

1911 births
1984 deaths
Artists from Rostov-on-Don
People from Don Host Oblast
Russian Jews
Soviet photographers
World War II photographers